Kipfler is a potato variety originating from Austria. The kipfler is elongated with a yellow skin and light yellow flesh. They are botanically classified as Solanum tuberosum and are members of the family Solanaceae along with eggplant and tomatoes. There are various families of these potatoes including the kerkauer kipfler from the Czech Republic or the naglerner kipfler from Germany. They are very popular in Australia.

Nutrition 
These potatoes contain manganese, potassium, fiber, copper and vitamin C.

Etymology 
The name Kipfler comes from the German , meaning 'croissant'.

References

Potato cultivars